Erkki Aaltonen (17 August 1910 – 8 March 1990) was a Finnish composer.

Biography
Born in Hämeenlinna (Tavastehus), Finland, he was a student of the violin at the Helsinki Conservatory and of composition in privacy with Väinö Raitio and Selim Palmgren. He directed the Kemi Music Institute from 1966 to 1973. His musical selections were often of a topical nature.

Selected works
Symphonies
No. 1 (1947)
No. 2 (1949) Hiroshima
No. 3 (1952) Popular
No. 4 (1959)
No. 5 (1964) Hämeenlinna rhapsody
Piano Concerto 1948
Piano Concerto 1954
Folk music for orchestra 1953–1960
Ballet suites from Lapponia 1956, 1959
Violin Concerto (1966)
Piano Sonata (1932, revised 1972)
Oboe Sonata (1945)
Preludi ja allegro (Prelude and Allegro) for viola and piano (1983)
five string quartets
piano pieces
songs

References

1910 births
1990 deaths
People from Hämeenlinna
People from Häme Province (Grand Duchy of Finland)
Finnish classical composers
20th-century classical composers
Finnish male classical composers
20th-century Finnish male musicians
20th-century Finnish composers